Constantin Lecca (4 August 1807 – 13 October 1887) was a Romanian painter and art professor. He was the first Romanian artist to create Western-style religious paintings. Although he worked in a variety of genres, including history painting, he is best known for his portraits.

Biography
He was born into a family of merchants. In 1827, he went to Buda to study painting, but it is not known where or with whom he studied, so he may have been essentially self-taught. In any event, he made his first contacts with Romanian revolutionaries and became a friend of Zaharia Carcalechi, contributing articles, translations and portraits to his Romanian Library.

In 1833, he accepted an invitation to teach at the "Școala Centrală" (Central School) in Craiova. Five years later, he became the founder and editor of one of Romania's first cultural magazines, Mozaicul. He also started a family and was sufficiently successful to travel extensively, including a trip to Paris from 1847 to 1848, where he joined the circle of Romanian patriots, centered around Nicolae Bălcescu and Dimitrie Bolintineanu, among others.

When he returned home, he participated in the Wallachian Revolution of 1848, having to quit his position and leave his family for fear of reprisals. After remaining under cover in his hometown for a time, he was able to secure a professorship at Saint Sava National College, thanks to the intercession of Petrache Poenaru. One of his best-known students was Theodor Aman.

For the next fifteen years, he collaborated with Mișu Popp, painting murals at several churches throughout Bucharest and the nearby countryside. Among them was the Curtea Veche Church, the oldest religious building in Bucharest that has not been significantly altered. It was at this time that he also established his reputation as a portrait painter.

In 1870, illness forced him to retire and he painted little, although he lived for seventeen more years.

Selected paintings

References

Further reading 
 Paul Rezeanu, Constantin Lecca,  Editura Arcade, 2005  
 Jack Brutaru, Constantin Lecca, Editura de Stat Pentru Literatură şi Arta, 1956

External links 

 Revista de cultura Mozaicul, new series

1807 births
1887 deaths
People from Brașov
Romanian muralists
Portrait painters
19th-century Romanian painters